The Menabrea I government of Italy held office from 27 October 1867 until 5 January 1868, a total of 70 days, or 2 months and 9 days.

Government parties
The government was composed by the following parties:

Composition

References

Italian governments
1867 establishments in Italy